Reply all may refer to:

 Reply All (podcast), a podcast about internet culture
 Reply all, an email responding to all parties on the original message
 Reply All (comic strip), a comic strip published by ArcaMax Publishing